Jerry Dewayne Robinson (born December 18, 1956) is an American former professional football player who was a linebacker in the National Football League (NFL) for thirteen seasons during the 1970s, 1980s and 1990s.  He played college football for the UCLA Bruins, and earned All-American honors.  Chosen in the first round of the 1979 NFL Draft, he played professionally for the Philadelphia Eagles and Los Angeles Raiders of the NFL.

Early years
Robinson was born in San Francisco, California.  He attended Cardinal Newman High School in Santa Rosa, California, where he played for the Cardinal Newman high school football team.

College career
Robinson attended the University of California, Los Angeles (UCLA), where he played for the Bruins from 1975 to 1978.  He was recruited as a tight end by Dick Vermeil, his future professional coach, who converted him to linebacker.  He was a three-time consensus first-team All-American (1976, 1977, 1978).  Robinson was inducted into the College Football Hall of Fame in 1996.

Professional career
He was a member of the Eagles for Super Bowl XV, and was chosen for the Pro Bowl after the  season. In his thirteen NFL seasons, he played in 184 games, started 147 of them, and compiled twelve interceptions and fifteen fumble recoveries.

References

1956 births
Living people
All-American college football players
American football linebackers
College Football Hall of Fame inductees
Los Angeles Raiders players
National Conference Pro Bowl players
Philadelphia Eagles players
Players of American football from San Francisco
UCLA Bruins football players
Ed Block Courage Award recipients